HMS Medway was a 60-gun fourth rate ship of the line of the Royal Navy, built at Deptford Dockyard to the draught specified by the 1745 Establishment, and launched on 14 February 1755. The launch was painted at least twice by John Cleveley the Elder.

In 1787 Medway was converted to serve as a receiving ship, and remained in this role until 1811, when she was broken up.

Notes

References

Lavery, Brian (2003) The Ship of the Line – Volume 1: The development of the battlefleet 1650–1850. Conway Maritime Press. .

External links 
 

Ships of the line of the Royal Navy
1755 ships